Convoy JW 51B was an Arctic convoy sent from United Kingdom by the Western Allies to aid the Soviet Union during World War II. It sailed in late December 1942, reaching the Soviet northern ports in early January 1943.

JW 51B came under attack by German surface units, engaged in Operation Regenbogen, on 31 December. In the clash that ensued, one defending minesweeper and one attacking destroyer were sunk with all hands and a defending destroyer was sunk; no ships were lost from the convoy. This engagement became known as the Battle of the Barents Sea.

Forces
JW 51A consisted of 15 merchant ships which departed from Loch Ewe on 22 December 1942. Close escort was provided by the minesweeper , two corvettes and two armed trawlers. The convoy sailed with a local escort group from Britain and was joined later by a local escort group from Murmansk. Distant cover was provided by a Heavy Cover Force from Iceland comprising the battleship , the cruiser  and five destroyers. JW 51B was opposed by a force of four U-boats in a patrol line in the Norwegian Sea and the aircraft of Luftflotte 5 based in Norway. A surface force comprising the heavy cruisers Admiral Hipper, Lützow and six destroyers was also available, stationed at Altenfjord.

Action

JW 51B departed Loch Ewe on 22 December 1942, accompanied by its local escort, of four destroyers, and its close escort.
Three days later, on 25 December, it was joined by the ocean escort, while the local escort departed.
On 27 December JW 51B ran into a gale, which scattered the convoy over the next two days into several groups across a wide area. One ship, was forced to return with weather damage, and five ships and two escorts had become separated.
Three of the ships rejoined on 30 December, but Chester Valley, in company with the armed trawler , and another, with the destroyer Oribi, remained separated. During the 30th also, Bramble detached from the main body of the convoy to search for the stragglers.

On 24 December the convoy had been sighted by a patrolling aircraft, but was lost later during the storm. However, on 30 December it was found again by U-354, and Operation Regenbogen was put into effect.
On 31 December the German ships, in two sections, met the ocean escort of JW 51B, and after a sharp engagement, which left the minesweeper Bramble and one destroyer Achates sinking, and another, Onslow, damaged, the attacking force was driven off. One German destroyer, Eckoldt was sunk, and a cruiser, Hipper, damaged.

No further attacks developed, and on 1 January 1943 Vizalma and her charge rejoined the convoy.
On 2 January JW 51B was met by its eastern local escort, two minesweepers from Murmansk.
On 3 January the main body arrived in Kola Inlet, joined the following day by Oribi and her charge.

Conclusion
The 15 ships of JW 51B arrived at Murmansk without loss, though one had been damaged. Despite the loss of two warships, JW 51B was a success, and the failure of the German surface force to mount an effective assault on the convoy caused a loss of confidence by Hitler in the German Navy and its commander, Admiral Erich Raeder, which eventually culminated in Raeder's resignation. Thereafter, the main threat to the Allied convoy system was from U-boats.

Ships involved

Allied ships

Merchant ships

 Ballot
 Calobre
 Chester Valley
 Daldorch
 Dover Hill
 
 

 Executive
 Jefferson Myers
 
 Pontfield
 Puerto Rican
 
 Vermont (ex. Pacific Hemlock, ex. West Helix)
 Yorkmar

Close escort
 Bramble
 Hyderabad
 Rhododendron
 
 Northern Gem

Ocean escort
 Onslow
 Obedient
 Obdurate
 Oribi
 Orwell
 Achates

Cruiser cover force
 Jamaica
 Sheffield
 Matchless
 Opportune

Distant cover force
 Anson
 
 Blankney
 Chiddingfold
 Forester
 Icarus
 Impulsive

Axis ships

U-boat force
(List is incomplete)
 

Surface force
 Admiral Hipper
 Lützow

Notes

References
 Blair, Clay Hitler's U-Boat War [Volume 2]: The Hunted 1942–1945 (1998)  (2000 UK paperback ed.)
 Kemp, Paul Convoy! Drama in Arctic Waters (1993) 
 Kemp, Paul U-Boats Destroyed (1997) 
 Neistle, Alex  German U-Boat Losses during World War II (1998) 
 Ross, Alan JW 51B: a Convoy a narrative poem in Poems 1942–67
 Ruegg, Bob; Hague, Arnold Convoys to Russia (1992) 
 Schofield, Bernard The Russian Convoys (1962) BT Batsford
 JW 51B at Convoyweb

JW 51B